Valery Zubanov (born 30 May 1951) is a Soviet sailor. He competed at the 1972 Summer Olympics, the 1976 Summer Olympics, and the 1980 Summer Olympics.

References

External links
 

1951 births
Living people
Soviet male sailors (sport)
Olympic sailors of the Soviet Union
Sailors at the 1972 Summer Olympics – Flying Dutchman
Sailors at the 1976 Summer Olympics – Flying Dutchman
Sailors at the 1980 Summer Olympics – Flying Dutchman
Sportspeople from Dnipro